Hugh Gray (19 April 1916 – 1 April 2002) was a British Labour Party politician and lecturer at the University of London.

In 1966 he defeated the Conservative incumbent Anthony Fell to become the Member of Parliament (MP) for Yarmouth until 1970, when Fell regained the seat from him. He unsuccessfully fought South Norfolk in October 1974 but never re-entered Parliament.

Gray died on 1 April 2002, aged 85.

References

Sources 
 Times Guide to the House of Commons February 1974

External links 
 

1916 births
2002 deaths
Labour Party (UK) MPs for English constituencies
Members of the Fabian Society
UK MPs 1966–1970
Politics of the Borough of Great Yarmouth